Body of Work: A Collection of Hits is the first greatest hits album released by Canadian country music singer Aaron Pritchett. It was released by Big Star Recordings on May 12, 2015 and serves as Pritchett's first full-length release on the label. The compilation includes thirteen popular singles from Pritchett's second studio album (Consider This in 2002) through his sixth studio album (In the Driver's Seat in 2010) as well as three exclusive tracks that were all released as singles. Pritchett is credited as a songwriter on nine tracks, including all of the releases from Thankful (2008) and In the Driver's Seat.

Background
In July 2013, following the release of "Suntan City", it was reported that Pritchett was working on his seventh studio album, which was expected to be released that fall. By July 2014, Pritchett had signed to Big Star Recordings. In October 2014, Pritchett told the Gabriola Sounder that he was in process of recording new songs, and that "there is no full album coming out, but we're looking at a "greatest hits" [album]. The title, release date, and track listing for Body of Work were announced in April 2015.

"Suntan City" was previously recorded by American country artist Luke Bryan on his EP of the same name (2012).

Singles
A cover of Luke Bryan's "Suntan City" was released digitally via On Ramp Records on May 16, 2013 and was serviced to Canadian country radio on May 28, 2013 and serves as the record's lead single. The song reached number 18 on the Billboard Canada Country airplay chart. It was re-issued as a digital single on January 28, 2015.

"Boat on the Water" was released July 15, 2014 as Pritchett's first release for Big Star Recordings. It reached a peak of 28 on the Canada Country chart. In October 2014, the song was voted the "most popular song" (at the time) on CMT.ca.

A third single, "Wake You with a Kiss", was released February 10, 2015. It reached 29 on the Canada Country chart.

Track listing

Chart performance

Singles

Release history

References

External links
 Body of Work: A Collection of Hits at AllMusic

2015 greatest hits albums
Aaron Pritchett albums
Big Star albums